Shon Adams, better known by his stage name E-A-Ski, is an American rapper and producer from Oakland, California. He served as both a rapper and producer for No Limit Records, producing on Master P's early records and also releasing some of his own material.

Music career

1990-95: No Limit, 1 Step Ahead Of Yall and Blast If I Have To
In the early 1990s E-A-Ski signed to fellow rapper Master P's label No Limit Records when he was based in Richmond, California. As a solo artist in 1992 with his collaborator DJ CMT he released his debut EP 1 Step Ahead of Yall. By the mid-1990s E-A-Ski had left No Limit Records and signed to Priority Records.  He released a second EP in 1995 also entitled Blast If I Have To, his first single from the album entitled "Blast If I Have To" it would also be a single from the Friday: Music from the Motion Picture.

1997-98: Earthquake
In 1997 after disbanding from Priority Records E-A-Ski signed to Relativity Records. In 1997 E-A-Ski released his first single from his upcoming debut album Earthquake entitled "Showdown"; it featured singer Montell Jordan. In 1998 after negotiating with Dreamworks Records to buy him out his contract from Relativity Records to promote Earthquake more quickly and aggressively than Relativity would or could, E-A-Ski and his label IMG agreed to sign to DreamWorks. Also in 1998 E-A-Ski released the second single from the album Earthquake entitled "25 With A Mill Ticket". But on December 7, 1998, E-A-Ski would sue DreamWorks for $30 million due to them at the time not wanting to release Earthquake; the album would later be shelved.

2001-10: The Resume
In 1996 E-A-Ski signed to Columbia Records and started working on a new album entitled Apply Pressure. In 2002 E-A-Ski released two singles from Apply Pressure entitled "Manuscript" and "Gangsta Funk". But, due to BMG buying into a percentage of Columbia Records, it stopped the release process of the album In 2003 E-A-Ski disbanded from Columbia Records and go completely independent with his label IMG, in that same year E-A-Ski released a single from Apply Pressure entitled "Can't Get Enough" featuring artists San Quinn and Allen Anthony. In 2004 E-A-Ski released a single from Apply Pressure entitled "Ride". In 2005 E-A-Ski released a single from Apply Pressure entitled "MyBad".

On September 7, 2010, E-A-Ski released his debut album entitled The Resume via his label IMG, it was his first album released in 15 years.

2010-present: The Fifth Of Skithoven
On October 31, 2010, during interview E-A-Ski announced that he was working on a new album entitled The Fifth Of Skithoven.

On April 3, 2012, E-A-Ski released a single entitled "Off The Radar" featuring artists King T and Young Maylay. On September 24, 2012, E-A-Ski released a single entitled "Cruise Control". On July 9, 2013, E-A-Ski  released a single entitled "That Ain't No Heat" featuring hip hop icon Messy Marv. On September 10, 2013, E-A-Ski released a single entitled "Ratchet Music".

On December 15, 2014, E-A-Ski released a single entitled "They Know".

On July 10, 2015, E-A-Ski released a single entitled "Wake Em Up" featuring artists Tech N9ne and Too $hort.

Record production
In 1992–1993 he produced several tracks on Spice 1's albums Spice 1 and 187 He Wrote . 187 He Wrote peaked at number 1 on the Billboard Top R&B/Hip-Hop Albums and at number 10 on the Billboard 200 in 1993.  Continuing to solidify the strength of his production work with Spice-1, the E-A-Ski produced Trigga Gots No Heart which also featured in the Menace II Society film, as well being released as a single (with video) for promotion for the now classic Hughes Brothers film.  The Menace II Society soundtrack is a platinum-certified album.

In 1995, E-A-Ski scored yet again with his production on "Playa Hater" off the Luniz Operation Stackola album.  Certified Platinum by the RIAA, Operation Stackola served as the Luniz highest-selling album to date, peaking at number 1 on the Billboard Top R&B/Hip-Hop Albums and at Number 20 on the Billboard 200 in 1995. In addition, the E-A-Ski produced song "Playa Hata" sparked the now infamous, and since resolved, beef between the Luniz and Too Short, which prompted Too Short to record several response records on his 10th album Gettin' It.

Discography

Studio albums

Extended plays

Soundtrack albums

Compilation albums

Miscellaneous

Singles

As lead artist

As featured artist

E-A-Ski and CMT production discography

1992
Spice 1 – Spice 1
03. "East Bay Gangster (Reggae)"
07. "Young Nigga"
14. "187 Pure"
TRU – Understanding the Criminal Mind
01. "Niggas From Calli"
04. "Little Slut"
08. "Im The Funkest"
09. "I Wear A Bullet Proof Vest"
10. "Understanding The Criminal Mind"
11. "1-900-Crime"

1993
Spice 1 – 187 He Wrote
02. "Dumpin' Em In Ditches"
11. "Runnin' Out Da Crackhouse"
12. "Trigga Gots No Heart"
14. "RIP"

1995
Kam – Made in America
03. "Pull Ya Hoe Card"
10. "Who Ridin"
Luniz – Operation Stackola
06. "Playa Hata" (feat. Teddy)
Master P – 99 Ways to Die
05. "Bullets Gots No Name" (feat. E-A-Ski and Rally Ral)

1996
Ice-T – VI – Return of the Real
02. "Where The Shit Goes Down" (feat. E-A-Ski)
Mr. Mike – Wicked Wayz
01. "Intro"
02. "Southwest" (feat. E-A-Ski)
03. "G's Perspective"
04. "Where Ya Love At"
10. "Da Boogie Man"
12. "Game Affiliation"

1997
Crime Boss – Conflicts & Confusion
02. "Conflicts & Confusion"
03. "No Friends"
06. "Back To The Streets"
08. "What Does It Mean (To Be A Real Crime Boss)"
09. "Close Range"
10. "Please Stop"
13. "Get Mine"

1998
Ka'Nut – Look At Em Now
03. "Reach Out And Touch Ya"
05. "Aint Tha Nigga"
06. "G-Slide"
11. "Cant Catch Me"
13. "How We Lay It Down"
Ice Cube – War & Peace Vol. 1 (The War Disc)
18. "Penitentiary"
Jayo Felony – Whatcha Gonna Do?
07. "Nitty Gritty"
08. "Im Deadly"
14. "Finna Shit On Em" (feat. Mack 10)
15. "Hustle In My Genes"

2000
Dual Committee – Dual Committee
02. "Your Friends"
03. "Cant Stop It"
DenGee – DenGee Livin'
02. "Break Bread" (feat. E-A-Ski)
03. "Den & Gee"
04. "Over Some Dope"
06. "Lucy Turf Walker" (feat. Mr. Town)
07. "Da Hustle" (feat. Silk-E Da People’s Champ)
08. "Broken Glass" (feat. San Quinn and T-Pup)
10. "Wig Split" (feat. Spice 1)
11. "VIP Status"
12. "Can't Wait" (feat. Silk-E. Da People’s Champ, No The Piper and T-Pup)
13. "Characters"
14. "What Do You Want"
15. "Palms, Elbows & Back Arms"

2002
B-Legit – Hard 2 B-Legit
05. "1 Dame" (feat. Harm)
Yukmouth – United Ghettos of America
06. "Da Lot"
10. "Fuck Friendz"

2004
Thug Lordz – In Thugz We Trust
07. "Killa Cali" (feat. Spice 1)
13. "21 Gun Salute"

2005
Mistah F.A.B. – Son of a Pimp
15. "N.E.W. Oakland" (feat. Bavgate and G-Stack)

2006
San Quinn – The Rock: Pressure Makes Diamonds
02. "Hell Yeah!" (feat. E-A-Ski and Allen Anthony)
Dem Hoodstarz – Band-Aid & Scoot
04. "How We Do" (feat. E-40 and Michael Marshall)
Messy Marv – Draped Up & Chipped Out
10. "Millionaire Gangstas"
Messy Marv – Gettin That Guac
04. "Here I" (feat. Selau)
Bullys wit Fullys – The Infrastructure
05. "So Hood" (feat. Clyde Carson)

2007
The Frontline – Lock & Left
00. All tracks except track 3
B-Legit – Throwblock Muzic
14. "Where Is This Going" (feat. Levitti)
Too Short – I Love The Bay
18. "Richmond"
Turf Talk – West Coast Vaccine: The Cure
05. "Super Star" (feat. Locksmith)

2010
Locksmith – Frank the Rabbit
00. All tracks

2014
MC Ren – Rebel Music (EP)
00. All tracks

2018
Ice Cube – Everythang's Corrupt
 "Still In The Kitchen"
 "Pocket Full of Evil"

See also
 No Limit Records

References

Living people
21st-century American male musicians
21st-century American rappers
African-American male rappers
American hip hop record producers
Gangsta rappers
G-funk artists
No Limit Records artists
Rappers from Oakland, California
Record producers from California
21st-century African-American musicians
1968 births
20th-century African-American people